Yvonne Arias is an American actress, known for portraying Maya Young in the television series Kamen Rider: Dragon Knight.

Life and career

Her first well-known missions had an actress, the years of Osbrink Talent belonged to Agency in Universal City and beginning a career as a TV reporter sought, starting from the year of 2004. That year she had next to guest appearances on Quintuplets and Eve also a recurring role as Dian in the soap opera Passions, where they were seen in a total of six episodes 2004–2005. Added to this was in addition to another appearance in an episode of ER. Her first film role in the martial arts film Confessions of a Pit Fighter. 2006 followed by numerous other engagements for Arias, including in the pilot episode of the series Cruumbs and into two equal consecutive episodes of Scrubs, which the beginners where they mimed the attractive sister Martinez.

In 2006 a published movie Gamers she put the character of Veronica, one of the more minor supporting roles, represents and was also in the same year with a brief appearance in Shut Up and Shoot! considered. In addition to another only minor cameo appearance in the movie White Air in 2007.

Arias received at the same time one of the main roles in the 2008 broadcast series Kamen Rider: Dragon Knight, where they henceforth joined by her stage name Aria Alistar in appearance and in all 40 episodes  participated within the 2010 broadcast.

Filmography

Film appearances (including cameo appearances)

 2005: Confessions of a Pit Fighter as Angel
 2006: Gamers: The Movie as Veronica
 2006: Shut Up and Shoot! as a News Reporter
 2007: White Air as Reporter Sanchez

TV Series appearances (including guest and cameo appearances)

 2004: Quintuplets as Zelda (1 episode)
 2004: Eve as a woman (1 episode) [Cameo]
 2004–2005: Passions as Dian (6 episodes)
 2005: ER as an Ice Skater (1 episode)
 2006 Crumbs as a Pretty Waitress (1 episode from Pilot)
 2006: Scrubs as Nurse Martinez (2 Episodes)
 2008–2009 Kamen Rider: Dragon Knight as Maya Young / Kamen Rider Siren II (Main Role) credited as Aria Alistar

External links

Date of birth unknown
Living people
American film actresses
Year of birth missing (living people)
21st-century American women
 Hispanic and Latino American actresses